The Hartree atomic units are a system of natural units of measurement which is especially convenient for calculations in atomic physics and related scientific fields, such as computational chemistry and atomic spectroscopy. They are named after the physicist Douglas Hartree.
Atomic units are often abbreviated "a.u." or "au", not to be confused with the same abbreviation used also for astronomical units, arbitrary units, and absorbance units in other contexts.

Defining constants 
By definition, each of the following four fundamental physical constants is expressed as the numeric value 1 multiplied by a coherent unit of this system:

Units 
Each unit in this system can be expressed as a product of powers of these four physical constants without a numerical multiplier. This makes it a coherent system of units, as well as making the numerical values of the defining constants in atomic units equal to unity.

Three of the defining contants (reduced Planck constant, elementary charge, and electron rest mass) are basic atomic units themselves – of action, electric charge, and mass, respectively. The two most important derived units are those of length (Bohr radius ) and energy (hartree ). The table below lists these and many other units that can be derived in the system.

Here,
  is the speed of light
  is the vacuum permittivity
  is the Rydberg constant
  is the Planck constant
  is the fine-structure constant
  is the Bohr magneton
  denotes correspondence between quantities since equality does not apply.

Use and notation 
Atomic units, like SI units, have a unit of mass, a unit of length, and so on. However, the use and notation is somewhat different from SI.

Suppose a particle with a mass of m has 3.4 times the mass of electron. The value of m can be written in three ways:

 "". This is the clearest notation (but least common), where the atomic unit is included explicitly as a symbol.
 "" ("a.u." means "expressed in atomic units"). This notation is ambiguous: Here, it means that the mass m is 3.4 times the atomic unit of mass. But if a length L were 3.4 times the atomic unit of length, the equation would look the same, "" The dimension must be inferred from context.
 "". This notation is similar to the previous one, and has the same dimensional ambiguity. It comes from formally setting the atomic units to 1, in this case , so .

Physical constants 
Dimensionless physical constants retain their values in any system of units. Of note is the fine-structure constant , which appears in expressions as a consequence of the choice of units. For example, the numeric value of the speed of light, expressed in atomic units, has a value related to the fine-structure constant.

Bohr model in atomic units 
Atomic units are chosen to reflect the properties of electrons in atoms, which is particularly clear in the classical Bohr model of the hydrogen atom for the bound electron in its ground state:

 Mass = 1 a.u. of mass
 Orbital radius = 1 a.u. of length
 Orbital velocity = 1 a.u. of velocity
 Orbital period = 2π a.u. of time
 Orbital angular velocity = 1 radian per a.u. of time
 Orbital angular momentum = 1 a.u. of momentum
 Ionization energy =  a.u. of energy
 Electric field (due to nucleus) = 1 a.u. of electric field
 Electrical attractive force (due to nucleus) = 1 a.u. of force

Non-relativistic quantum mechanics in atomic units 
In the context of atomic physics, nondimensionalization using the defining constants of the Hartree atomic system can be a convenient shortcut, since it can be thought of as eliminating these constants wherever they occur.  Nondimesionalization involves a substitution of variables that results in equations in which these constants (and ) "have been set to 1".  Though the variables are no longer the original variables, the same symbols and names are typically used.

For example, the Schrödinger equation for an electron with quantities that use SI units is
 

The same equation with corresponding nondimensionalized quantity definitions is
 

For the special case of the electron around a hydrogen atom, the Hamiltonian with SI quantities is:
 

while the corresponding nondimensionalized equation is

Comparison with Planck units 
Both Planck units and atomic units are derived from certain fundamental properties of the physical world, and have little anthropocentric arbitrariness, but do still involve some arbitrary choices in terms of the defining constants. Atomic units were designed for atomic-scale calculations in the present-day universe, while Planck units are more suitable for quantum gravity and early-universe cosmology. Both atomic units and Planck units use the reduced Planck constant. Beyond this, Planck units use the two fundamental constants of general relativity and cosmology: the gravitational constant  and the speed of light in vacuum, . Atomic units, by contrast, use the mass and charge of the electron, and, as a result, the speed of light in atomic units is  The orbital velocity of an electron around a small atom is of the order of 1 atomic unit, so the discrepancy between the velocity units in the two systems reflects the fact that electrons orbit small atoms by around 2 orders of magnitude more slowly than the speed of light.

There are much larger differences for some other units. For example, the unit of mass in atomic units is the mass of an electron, while the unit of mass in Planck units is the Planck mass, which is 22 orders of magnitude larger than the atomic unit of mass. Similarly, there are many orders of magnitude separating the Planck units of energy and length from the corresponding atomic units.

See also 
 Natural units
 Planck units
 Various extensions of the CGS system to electromagnetism

Notes and references

External links 

Systems of units
Natural units
Atomic physics